Martin Bagge (born 29 November 1958) is a Swedish musician and composer known for his interpretations of Carl Michael Bellman's songs.

Biography

Martin Bagge was educated at the Academy of Music at the University of Gothenburg. As a songwriter, he specializes in older Swedish songwriters such as Carl Michael Bellman,  Olof von Dalin, and Lasse Lucidor, but he has also set to music lyrics by writers such as Harry Martinson and Elisabet Hermodsson. He also performs Bellman songs abroad, for example in Germany and Denmark. As a choral composer, he has attracted attention for his settings of poems by Federico García Lorca and Ebba Lindqvist. 

His recordings include many of Carl Michael Bellman's 1790 Fredman's Epistles and 1791 Fredman's Songs, such as "Glimmande nymf", "Ack, du min moder", "Vila vid denna källa", and "Fjäriln vingad syns på Haga". Like Bellman, he plays a cittern. His approach, in the opinion of Ingrid Strömdahl, writing in Svenska Dagbladet, is respectful of the poetry and of Bellman's sharp observation of human nature, the environment, and unusual ways of being; he interprets the work "with heart and soul".

Together with the literary scholar David Anthin, he has during the summers of 2015, 2017-2019 carried out four sailing trips on the cruiser Flory on Sweden's west coast, and performed songs by Evert Taube on beach trips, and as lunchtime theatre in Gothenburg, in a program called "Cruising with Taube".

Martin Bagge has collaborated with musicians including Alf Hambe, Lars Jansson, Lars Danielsson, Dan Berglund and Cajsa Román.

Prizes and distinctions

 2001 – Member of 
 2001 – 
 2001 – 
 2009 – 
 2019 – Honorary doctorate at the University of Gothenburg

Discography

 1984 – Så drivs vi
 1986 – Till ett barn, en vind, ett träd
 1989 – Kärlek och Bacchus
 1992 – Om sommaren
 1993 – Blåsen nu alla
 1995–97 – Fredmans Epistlar och Sånger
 1997 – Kom fria sinnen hit
 1998 – Martin Bagge gör Carl Michael Bellman levande: 'Upptåger' från ungdomsåren
 1999 – Till Isagel
 2000 – Till Undrans land
 2001 – Fredmans Epistlar och Sånger
 2002 – Fredmans Episteln und Gesänge
 2002 – Fredman's Epistles and Songs
 2005 – Wärldslige och Andelige Sånger
 2007 – ...vid denna strand, vid detta hav, vid detta vatten
 2012 – Ack, libertas! – wisor av  2014 – Vägen ut ''(with Trio Isagel)

References 

1958 births
20th-century Swedish musicians
Interpreters of Carl Michael Bellman's works
Living people